Volhv Veleslav (Cyrillic: Волхв Велеслав) (born Ilya Cherkasov (Cyrillic: Илья Черкасов), October 8, 1973), also known as Влх. Велеслав (Vlh. Veleslav) and V.L.S.L.V., is a Russian Rodnover priest. He is also an author, artist, poet, teacher and lecturer. Veleslav is the founder of Rodolubie (Rodoljub) and the  Veles circle. His early works form the basis of the Slavic neopaganism movement and its reconstruction. Veleslav is the author of several books on Russian and Slavic traditions, including The Doctrine/Teachings of the Magi: The White Book (2007, 2nd ed. 2010); The Black Book of Mara (2008); Living Vedas of Russ: Revelations of Native Gods (2008); the Book of Veles's Tales (2005), and "The Book of the Great Nav" (2011), amongst many others. He has also contributed to the first magazine for Rodnovers, "Родноверие".

Early life
Since childhood, Veleslav has been fond of history, and while still a child he enthusiastically read Russian folk tales and epics. He attended the "School of the young historian" at Moscow State University. Upon leaving for the summer holidays to visit the village of Semenovskoe, near Tver, he listened with great enthusiasm to stories of old "former life" and gathered together local folklore, including songs, stories, plots, bylichki and legends. Seeking an answer to the question about the meaning of life soon led Veleslav to an independent spiritual quest.

In 1990, Veleslav graduated from high school, but instead of going to the MSU faculty of history and philosophy as his family and friends expected, he announced that he was not interested in a career as a scientist, historian or philosopher, claiming that they  "speak of truth, without knowing her". After sewing together a Russian burlap shirt, he stopped eating meat, cut his hair, and began practicing yoga as well as other spiritual disciplines. At that time in Russia there were many different sects, cults and spiritual teachings, and the ROC began to gain momentum. Veleslav communicated with the followers of these groups and was interested in the essence of their teachings, but he did not join any of them, considering that truth is "realised in the heart, and not by following any doctrine, church dogma, or the partial view of a religious leader."

Author
In 1992, Veleslav wrote his first book, "Samizdat", "The Doctrine of the Heart." Soon Veleslav gathered around him a small group of like-minded people who were united by a spiritual quest.

On February 24, 1998, together with like-minded people, Veleslav announced the creation of the Russian-Slavic Rodnover Community, "Rodoljub", and a spiritual and educational society, "Satya Veda" (Sanskrit, "True Knowledge"), which during the first year operated as a single unit.

According to Veleslav, this date (February 24, 1998) marked the official date of his community. This was followed by a period of relatively short duration (one year), but which was nevertheless very significant in its results. It was at this time that the foundation was laid for the future community: developing and maintaining a ritual practice; and a worldview was formed... May 12, 1998, was the date of the first public ceremony for the reconstructed houses in the near Teply Stan. The ritual began with the worship of Veles, the Slavic God of Wisdom, Spiritual Patron of the community, and was aimed at the reunification of the participating forces with Native Gods. One year the community's pagan temple was desecrated by Christians: a ritual statue of Veles was thrown into the running water of a nearby stream; a stone Alatyrny svorochen was thrown from a mountain, and the remaining logs were cut with "Orthodox" crosses. This caused the community to equip a new temple in the more distant location where it still stands today.

In 1999, Veleslav, together with a group of Commonwealth Communities, created the "Veles' Circle", which still exists today. The stated objectives of the  Veles circle are:

Restoration, conservation and enhancement of the spiritual heritage of their ancestors.
Practical development and implementation of the Volkhvs' Knowledge (Vedaniya).
Research and spiritual outreach.

Appearances
He is featured performing a speech on Noch Velesova, a 2009 DVD by the band Arkona. Veleslav's artwork is featured in the 2012 book Родные Боги в творчестве славянских художников by Dr. Pavel Tulaev.

In the book "Gap" by Askr Svarte, he devotes to Veleslav gratitude for teachings on the Path.

Written works
Under the name Veleslav

Under the name Satyavan
Veleslav has written several books on Advaita Saiva Dharma (the teachings of non-dual Shaivism) and Tantra under the pseudonym Satyavan (from Sanskrit "Satya" - "The Truth"). From the publishing house Сатья-Веда (Satya-Veda):
 "Кали-видья" (Kali-vidya) - 2003
 "Пурна-Адвайта" (Purna Advaita) - 2003. The book contains treatises of Satyavan revealing the basis of Advaita Shaivism (non-dual Shaivism). World of all living things!
 "Шива-видья" (Shiva Vidya) - 2003
From Moscow Institute of Humanities Studies:
 "Калагни-тантра" (Kalagni Tantra) - 2007. Your attention is directed to Tantric treatises of Satyavan and Saiva Dharma Advaita (nondual Shaivism), revealing one of the important parties, Satya Sanatana Dharma (Eternal True Dharma).

See also
 Askr Svarte
 Slavic neopaganism

References

Notes and interviews
 Biography
 Interview Sept 12, 2008
 Interview Sept 4, 2009
 Interview Jan 21, 2010
 Interview Jan 29, 2010
 Interview Apr 9, 2010
 Interview May 12, 2010
 Interview Mar 29, 2011, May 10, 2011, Oct 4, 2011
 Interview Oct 5, 2012
 Interview Feb 4, 2013
 Interview Jan 2013 with German magazine 'По свету' (By/In the Light/Around The World) Posted online in Russian (scans) by the interviewer on April 24, 2013. Magazine link www.po-swetu.de
 Interview May 13, 2013 - Direct link to Document
 Interview May 14, 2013 (Video) - answers to questions posed on Apr 27, 2013
 Rodnovery in Russia
 Video lectures
 The Commonwealth of Commons, "Velez CIRCLE": 
 The Book of the Great Navi by Volhv Veleslav (2011)

External links
 Official livejournal
 A site dedicated to the Slavic Holiday - Kupala, organised by Veleslav
 The Community "Rodoljub"
 Official journal for Satyavan

1973 births
Living people
Russian modern pagans
Writers from Moscow
Modern pagan writers
Modern pagan poets
Modern pagan religious leaders
Clergy from Moscow